Going South or variants may refer to:

Going South (1992 film) (Italian 'Verso Sud') Italian drama film
Going South (2009 film) (French 'Plein Sud')
Goin' South, 1978 Western Jack Nicholson film
"Goin' South" (song), song by The Beach Boys
Goin' Southbound song by  Stan Ridgway 1989
Going South (book), a 2021 memoir by Lorde

See also
Heading South (Vers le sud), 2005 French-Canadian drama film 
Gone South, music festival